Yagüe is a Spanish surname. It is possibly derived from a name for someone born on St James' Day, from Old Spanish Santi Yague, a common medieval form of Santiago. Notable people with the surname include:

Albert Yagüe (born 1985), Spanish footballer
Brigitte Yagüe (born 1981), Spanish taekwondo practitioner 
Juan Yagüe (1891–1952), Spanish army officer during the Spanish Civil War
Pablo Yagüe (–1943), Spanish trade union leader

References

Spanish-language surnames